Norički Vrh is a settlement in the suburbs of Gornja Radgona in northeastern Slovenia.

The Kunej Mansion is a two-story mansion east of the main settlement, first mentioned in written sources dating to the 15th century. It was rebuilt in its current form around 1870 and its landscaped garden dates from 1935.

References

External links
Norički Vrh on Geopedia

Populated places in the Municipality of Gornja Radgona